Russell Francis MacNeil (February 24, 1931 – June 16, 2018) was a Canadian politician. He represented the electoral district of Cape Breton Centre in the Nova Scotia House of Assembly from 1989 to 1998. He was a member of the Nova Scotia Liberal Party.

Early life and career
MacNeil was born in 1931 at New Waterford, Nova Scotia. He graduated from St. Francis Xavier University with an arts degree in 1953, and an education degree in 1954. Following graduation, MacNeil was a physical education teacher in New Waterford, and later served as the recreation director for the province of Nova Scotia.

Political career

MacNeil entered provincial politics in 1989, running as the Liberal candidate in a Cape Breton Centre by-election. Defeated by seven votes on election night, the number was reduced to two when official results were announced. However, a judicial recount in September ended with MacNeil being declared the winner by three votes. His Progressive Conservative opponent appealed to the Nova Scotia Supreme Court, and in February 1990, the by-election was declared invalid and MacNeil's victory voided. A second by-election was held on August 28, 1990, with MacNeil winning the seat. He was re-elected in the 1993 election, and served as a backbench member of John Savage's government. MacNeil did not seek re-election in 1998.

MacNeil died on June 16, 2018, in Halifax, Nova Scotia.

References

1931 births
2018 deaths
Nova Scotia Liberal Party MLAs
People from New Waterford, Nova Scotia
St. Francis Xavier University alumni